The Killer Likes Candy is a 1968 Italian-French-German Eurospy film directed by Maurice Cloche and  Federico Chentrens and starring  Kerwin Mathews. It is loosely based on the novel A coeur ouvert pour face d ange by Adam Saint-Moore.

Plot

Cast 

 Kerwin Mathews as Mark
 Bruno Cremer  as Oscar Snell
 Marilù Tolo as Sylva
 Venantino Venantini  as Costa
 Ann Smyrner	as Veronica	
 Riccardo Garrone  as Nicolo
 Werner Peters  as Guardino
 Gordon Mitchell  as Toni
 Lukas Ammann  as  Faoud
 Sieghardt Rupp		 as Ali
  Alain Saury as The General
 Elisa Cegani as Miss Boldani
 Fabienne Dali
 Umberto Raho		
 Giuseppe Addobbati

References

External links

Italian spy thriller films
French spy thriller films
West German films
German spy thriller films
1960s spy thriller films
Films directed by Maurice Cloche
Films about assassinations
Films about contract killing
Films based on French novels
English-language French films
English-language German films
English-language Italian films
1960s French films
1960s Italian films
1960s German films